William de Montfort (also Mountfort) was an English medieval Canon law jurist, singer, dean, and university chancellor. He was apparently the son of Peter de Montfort.

William de Montfort was a Professor or Doctor of Canon law. He was Chantor at Hereford Cathedral. During 1282–3, he was Chancellor of the University of Oxford. From 1285 to 1294 he was Dean of St Paul's Cathedral in London.

References

Year of birth unknown
Year of death unknown
Canon law jurists
English legal scholars
English male singers
13th-century English Roman Catholic priests
Chancellors of the University of Oxford
13th-century English lawyers